Kut Chum is a district (amphoe) of Yasothon province in northeastern Thailand.

History
The village of Kut Chum was established in 1912. A minor district (king amphoe), Kut Chum was established on 1 August 1961. It was composed of the four sub-districts: Non Pueai, Phai (in 1978 reassigned to Sai Mun District), Phon Ngan, and Kammaet, all split off from Mueang Yasothon district.

On 17 July 1963, it was elevated to the level of district (amphoe), then of Ubon Ratchathani province. When Yasothon was separated from Ubon, Kut Chum was one of the districts assigned to the new province.

Geography
Neighboring districts are (from the northeast clockwise): Loeng Nok Tha, Thai Charoen, Pa Tio, Mueang Yasothon, and Sai Mun of Yasothon Province, and Selaphum and Nong Phok of Roi Et province.

Economy

Kut Chum is known for its organic movement and organic foods, chiefly the organic farming of rice. Kut Chum also achieved fame for issuing its own local scrip called Bia Kut Chum. To side-step implications that they intended a substitute local currency, they changed to Boon Kut Chum, which are barter coupons with a fixed value in baht, that may be exchanged for goods and services in the community.

Administration
The district is divided into nine sub-districts (tambons) and 125 villages (mubans).

Local administration
Kut Chum Phatthana is a sub-district municipality (thesaban tambon) which covers parts of sub-districts Kut Chum and Non Pueai. There are a further nine tambon administrative organizations (TAO), one for each sub-district covering the non-municipal areas.

Schools
The secondary schools in Kut Chum are:
Kut Chum Witthayakhom School (โรงเรียนกุดชุมวิทยาคม)
Kam Maet Khanti Tham School (โรงเรียนกำแมดขันติธรรม)
Phon Ngam Phiyakhan School (โรงเรียนโพนงามพิยาคาร)

See also
 Rosana Tositrakul

References

External links
amphoe.com (Thai)

Districts of Yasothon province